Shush-e Sofla (also Romanized as Shūsh-e Soflá; also known as Shūsht-e Pā’īn and Shūsht-e Soflá) is a village in Babuyi Rural District, Basht District, Basht County, Kohgiluyeh and Boyer-Ahmad Province, Iran. At the 2006 census, its population was 133, in 26 families.

References 

Populated places in Basht County